The 2024 World Athletics Indoor Championships will be the 19th edition of the international indoor track and field competition, organised by the World Athletics. The event will be held between 1–3 March at the Commonwealth Arena in Glasgow, United Kingdom. It will be the third time, after Birmingham 2003 and 2018, that the World Indoor Championships will be held in this country, and the first time in Scotland. Glasgow hosted the European Athletics Indoor Championships in 1990 and 2019. As in 2019, the competitions will again take place in the Commonwealth Arena.

The event will come six months before the Olympic Games and will be part of the qualification process for Paris 2024.

Bidding process
Bidding began in March 2021 with final presentations in the autumn. Glasgow, Toruń in Poland and Kazakhstan all submitted bids to host the 2024 World Athletics Indoor Championships. On 1 December 2021, at their meeting in Monaco, the World Athletics Council chose Glasgow to host the 19th edition of championships.

References

External links
World Athletics website

World Athletics Indoor Championships
World Athletics Indoor Championships
World Indoor Championships
International athletics competitions hosted by the United Kingdom